Cross compatibility may refer to:

 Cross-browser compatibility, ability of website or application to function across different browsers
 Software compatibility, compatibility between different systems
 Cross-platform, software implemented on multiple computing platforms.